My Big Fat Fabulous Life is an American reality television series that premiered on January 13, 2015. Thore became popular when her former radio station's morning show, Jared and Katie in the Morning on 107.5 KZL, in Greensboro, North Carolina, came up with and posted  "107.5 KZL's Fat Girl Dancing" videos, with more than eight million views on YouTube.

Cast

Main
 Whitney Way Thore
 Barbara "Babs" Thore
 Glenn Thore
 Hunter Thore
 Buddy Bell
 Ashley Baynes
 Todd Beasley
 Tal Fish
 Heather Sykes (seasons 2–9)

Recurring
 Hunter Thore
 Chase Severino (seasons 7–8; guest season 9)
 Ryan Andreas (seasons 7–8)

Episodes

Series overview

Season 1 (2015)

Season 2 (2015)

Note: Episode 0, "Special Weigh-In," premiered on September 16, 2015.

Season 3 (2016)

Season 4 (2017)

Season 5 (2018)

Season 6 (2019)

Season 7 (2020)

Season 8 (2020–21)

Season 9 (2021)

Season 9 (2022)

International broadcast 
In Australia, the series premiered on TLC on May 26, 2015.

References

External links 
 

2015 American television series debuts
2010s American reality television series
2020s American reality television series
English-language television shows
Fat acceptance movement
Obesity in television
TLC (TV network) original programming